Richland Township is a township in Cambria County, Pennsylvania, United States. The population was 12,814 at the 2010 census. It is part of the Johnstown, Pennsylvania Metropolitan Statistical Area.

Geography
Richland Township is located in southwestern Cambria County and is bordered to the south by Somerset County. The borough of Geistown is along the northwestern edge of the township, and the borough of Scalp Level is on the township's southern border. The boroughs are separate from the township.

U.S. Route 219, a four-lane expressway, runs through the township, leading northeast  to Ebensburg, the county seat, and southwest  to Somerset. Pennsylvania Route 56, the Johnstown Expressway, leads  from U.S. 219 northwest to the center of Johnstown.

The Stonycreek River forms the southwestern border of the township and flows northwestward to form the Conemaugh River in the center of Johnstown.

Richland Township serves as the central retail area for Johnstown and its two-county metropolitan area. It is the location of The Johnstown Galleria, the largest mall in the area.

Communities

Census-designated places
Census-designated places are geographical areas designated by the U.S. Census Bureau for the purposes of compiling demographic data. They are not actual jurisdictions under Pennsylvania law. Other unincorporated communities, such as villages, may be listed here as well.

 Belmont

Unincorporated communities

 Ingleside
 Kring
 Number 37
 Walsell

Demographics

As of the census of 2000, there were 12,598 people, 4,741 households, and 3,133 families residing in the township.  The population density was 631.2 people per square mile (243.7/km2).  There were 4,994 housing units at an average density of 250.2/sq mi (96.6/km2).  The racial makeup of the township was 97.13% White, 0.78% African American, 0.10% Native American, 1.43% Asian, 0.13% from other races, and 0.44% from two or more races. Hispanic or Latino of any race were 0.52% of the population.

There were 4,741 households, out of which 24.1% had children under the age of 18 living with them, 56.8% were married couples living together, 7.4% had a female householder with no husband present, and 33.9% were non-families. 30.7% of all households were made up of individuals, and 17.6% had someone living alone who was 65 years of age or older.  The average household size was 2.27 and the average family size was 2.84.

In the township the population was spread out, with 17.3% under the age of 18, 17.6% from 18 to 24, 20.5% from 25 to 44, 22.3% from 45 to 64, and 22.4% who were 65 years of age or older.  The median age was 42 years. For every 100 females there were 85.6 males.  For every 100 females age 18 and over, there were 81.8 males.

The median income for a household in the township was $36,280, and the median income for a family was $45,395. Males had a median income of $35,420 versus $25,039 for females. The per capita income for the township was $18,383.  About 4.7% of families and 7.2% of the population were below the poverty line, including 10.9% of those under age 18 and 6.1% of those age 65 or over.

Education
The township is served by Richland School District, the University of Pittsburgh at Johnstown, and Pennsylvania Highlands Community College

References

External links
Richland Township official website
University of Pittsburgh at Johnstown
Pennsylvania Highlands Community College

Populated places established in 1780
Townships in Cambria County, Pennsylvania